Bandera binotella is a species of snout moth in the genus Bandera. It was described by Philipp Christoph Zeller in 1872. It is found in North America, including Texas, New Mexico, California, Colorado and Alberta.

References

Phycitinae
Moths described in 1872
Taxa named by Philipp Christoph Zeller